Leef may refer to:

People
Ryan Leef (born 1973), Canadian politician
Daphni Leef (born 1986), Israeli social activist

Other uses
Leef Township, Madison County, Illinois

See also
John Ewbank Leefe (1813–1889), English botanist and Anglican priest
Leaf (disambiguation)
Leif (disambiguation)